The men's S7 50 metres freestyle competition of the swimming events at the 2015 Parapan American Games was held on August 12, 2015 at the Toronto Pan Am Sports Centre.

Schedule
All times are Eastern Standard Time (UTC-5).

Results

Heats

Heat 1

Heat 2

Final

References

Swimming at the 2015 Parapan American Games